Cumia antillana is a species of sea snail, a marine gastropod mollusk in the family Colubrariidae.

Description

Distribution
This species occurs in the Caribbean Sea and in the Gulf of Mexico.

References

 Monsecour D. & Monsecour K. (2011) The family Colubrariidae Dall, 1904 in the western Atlantic, including the description of two new species. Gloria Maris 50(5): 107–123

Colubrariidae